The Poor Richard Club was a private club in Philadelphia, Pennsylvania, whose members were mostly members of the advertising industry. The club bestowed an annual Gold Medal of Achievement to numerous celebrities, including several US Presidents.

History 
The club was founded in 1906 with 75 members, just a year after a similar club opened in New York. The advertising industry was on a quest for more respectability, and the clubs were created as a way to promote and enforce ethical guidelines. Nevertheless, they functioned largely as places to nurture business, social, and political relationships.

The following year, the club purchased a large Victorian house at 239-241 Camac Street , where their weekly lunches and monthly dinners were held. By 1911, membership had grown to 350.

In 1916, the club published "Poor Richard's Dictionary of Philadelphia," an informative, sometimes humorous, guide to all aspects of the city, including historical landmarks, businesses, churches, hotels, hospitals, and clubs. The book was presented to Associated Advertising Clubs of the World members who attended the annual meeting held at the Poor Richard Club House.

In 1925, the club moved to the Dr. Joseph Leidy House, 1319 Locust Street, which they shared with the Charles Morris Price School of Advertising and Journalism, founded by members of the club in 1920.

The club was instrumental in proposing, funding, and raising the Benjamin Franklin National Memorial, built in 1933.

The club's major event was its annual banquet, at which the members presented an annual award for public service. Among the recipients of the club's Gold Medal of Achievement were:

 William Howard Taft
 Woodrow Wilson
 Will Rogers
 Amelia Earhart
Walt Disney, 1934
Will Rogers, 1935
Alfred P. Sloan, Jr., 1936
Captain Eddie Rickenbacker, 1937
Will H. Hays, 1938
Colonel David Sarnoff, 1939
Dr. Leo S. Rowe, 1940
Walter D. Fuller, 1941
Walter M. Dear, 1942
Donald M. Nelson, 1943

General H. H. Arnold, 1944
Bob Hope, 1945
Ted R. Gamble, 1946
Robert McLean, 1947
General Dwight D. Eisenhower, 1948
Vladimir K. Zworykin, 1949
Paul G. Hoffman, 1950
Charles E. Wilson, 1951
General Douglas MacArthur, 1952
William S. Paley, 1953
Henry Ford II, 1954
Clare Boothe Luce, 1955
Richard M. Nixon, 1956
William B. Murphy, 1966    
Lee Iacocca, 1985

On January 17, 1956, the club held their 50th anniversary dinner at the Bellevue-Stratford Hotel and honored then Vice President Richard Nixon with the Gold Medal of Achievement.

The club had over 600 members in the 1930s, but membership declined in the 1970s.  The Locust Street building was sold in 1979, and the club disbanded a few years later.

References

Further reading
 Lutz, Jack (1953). The Poor Richard Club: its birth, growth and activities, and its influence on advertising, the city, state and nation. 237 pp. Published by the Poor Richard Club.

Organizations based in Philadelphia